Bryan Township is one of eleven townships in Thurston County, Nebraska, United States. The population was 110 at the 2020 census.

References

External links
City-Data.com

Townships in Thurston County, Nebraska
Townships in Nebraska